In epidemiology, attributable fraction among the exposed (AFe) is the proportion of incidents in the exposed group that are attributable to the risk factor. The term attributable risk percent among the exposed is used if the fraction is expressed as a percentage.

It is used when an exposure increases the risk, as opposed to reducing it, in which case its symmetrical notion is preventable fraction among the unexposed.

Synonyms 
Multiple synonyms of AFe are in use: attributable fraction, relative attributable risk, attributable proportion among the exposed, and attributable risk among the exposed.

Similarly, attributable risk percent (ARP) is used as a synonym for the attributable risk percent among the exposed.

In climatology, fraction of attributable risk (FAR) is used to denote a proportion of adverse event risk attributable to the human influence on climate or other forcing factor.

Numerical example

See also

 Population Impact Measures
Attributable fraction for the population

References

Epidemiology